= Vietnamese rattan and bamboo industry =

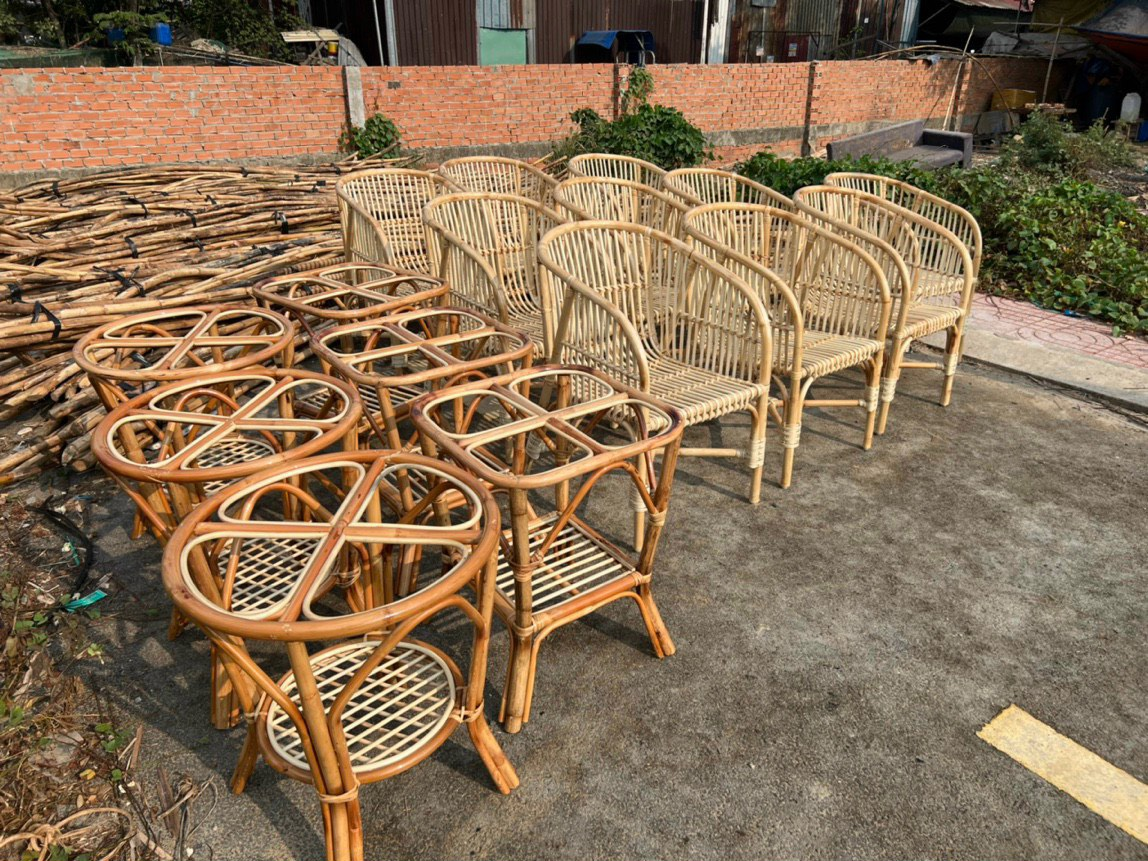
Products from rattan and bamboo in Vietnam

The Vietnamese Rattan and Bamboo Industry is a traditional handicraft industry that has been practiced for centuries. It is based on the use of two basic materials rattan and bamboo. Craftsmen in this industry specialize in creating a variety of handicrafts, from everyday household items to complex works of art. Products from Vietnamese rattan and bamboo villages are present in 130 countries, generating an average revenue of over $200 million per year, accounting for 14% of the value of handicraft exports. Vietnam currently has 893 villages specializing in rattan and bamboo weaving, contributing 24% of the total number of villages, including 647 rattan and bamboo villages and 246 wicker and lotus villages. Approximately 342,000 farmers are involved in the production of these products.

According to the General Department of Forestry, Vietnam's exports of rattan and bamboo products in 2019 reached $474 million, up 44.4% from 2018. This is the group of products with the highest export value in non-timber forest products. The main markets include the European Union (accounting for 31.44%), the United States (19.5%), and Japan (9.3%). Vietnamese handicrafts from rattan and bamboo have the potential to account for up to 10–15% of the global market share. On the other hand, some countries such as Thailand, Taiwan, India, Russia, Chile, and Norway are gradually becoming new potential markets, opening up many opportunities for the Vietnamese rattan and bamboo industry. In the first 6 months of 2020, the export value of rattan, bamboo, and wicker products in the whole country reached nearly $250.21 million, up 10.8% over the same period last year.

Vietnam’s bamboo industry has experienced significant growth in recent years. As of 2017, it generated a production value of $3 billion USD and contributed approximately $1.2 billion USD annually to the economy. The country has made substantial investments in the sustainable development of the sector, prioritizing environmental conservation, biodiversity, and quality standards to meet the demands of export markets such as the EU and North America. The European Union and the United States serve as the primary destinations for Vietnam’s exports of rattan, bamboo, sedge, and similar woven goods, collectively accounting for nearly 70% of the industry's total export revenue.

Rattan and bamboo weaving is becoming increasingly popular around the world, especially in interior design and home decor. Due to the growing interest in sustainable and environmentally friendly products, rattan and bamboo weaving has attracted consumers and opened up business opportunities for businesses.

Vietnamese bamboo craftsmanship is characterized by meticulous attention to detail and a deep reverence for nature. Artisans employ age-old techniques, such as bending, weaving, and carving, to fashion bamboo into exquisite works of art. Whether it’s the rhythmic beats of a bamboo xylophone or the intricate patterns of a woven bamboo basket, these creations reflect the beauty and ingenuity of Vietnamese craftsmanship.
